Share (Saare) is an ancient Yoruba town in Ifelodun Local Government Area of Kwara State, Nigeria.
Share is the headquarter of Ifelodun Local Government Area.about 64 Kilometres from Ilorin the state capital of Kwara state. The people of Share belong to the Igbomina extract of Yoruba tribe.

TOURIST ATTRACTION IN SHARE TOWN
 Spring goddess called Soose Spring Odò Soose
 Agbonna Hill called Òkè Àgbonnà 
 Stillborn's Cave called Kòtò-Àbíkú
 Mysterious Tree called Igi-Aìmò

Prominent Higher institutions in Share Town
 Adeshina College of Education 
 UMCA Bible College

Notable people
Abdulfatah Ahmed Governor of Kwara State)
Late Balogun of Share Alhaji AbdulAzeez Ismail Balogun. First Ifelodun Local Government councillor for Works, Land and Housing

References 

Populated places in Kwara State